The Hoffman Barn in Deuel County, South Dakota, near Revillo, was built in 1920.  It is a Wisconsin Dairy Barn.  It has also been known as Skatvold Barn.  It was listed on the National Register of Historic Places in 2005.

It is a two-story wood Wisconsin Dairy Barn with a concrete full basement. As of 2005, the exterior was painted "brownish" with white-painted trim.

It may be the barn located at exactly  in 2018 Google satellite view imagery, in a farm located on County Road 513.

References

National Register of Historic Places in South Dakota
Buildings and structures completed in 1920
Deuel County, South Dakota
Wisconsin dairy barns